Suigu Nature Reserve is a nature reserve which is located in Lääne-Viru County, Estonia.

The protected area was founded in 1976 to protect Suigu primeval forest.

References

Nature reserves in Estonia
Geography of Lääne-Viru County